0 + 2 = 1  is a compilation album by Vancouver punk band Nomeansno.  Recorded in 1991 and released as a digital album in 2010, it includes five outtakes and four demo tracks recorded for 0 + 2 = 1, Nomeansno's fifth full-length record and final album to feature Nomeansno's longtime guitarist Andy Kerr.

Background and release
In July 1991, Nomeansno returned to Profile Sound Studios to record their follow-up to the album Wrong with producer Cecil English.  They recorded 19 songs during the sessions, of which 11 appeared on the final record, 0 + 2 = 1 on Alternative Tentacles, two on the "Oh Canaduh" 7-inch EP on Allied Recordings, and one on the Dead Kennedys tribute album Virus 100.  The remaining five outtakes were ultimately re-recorded for subsequent Nomeansno albums, but went unreleased in these earlier forms for 19 years.

Andy Kerr, who departed the band after the touring in support of the album's release, later rediscovered the outtakes and demo versions of unused songs from the era.  Ultimately, the band released these as 0 + 2 = 1 , a digitally released compilation through their own Wrong Records imprint.  The album was initially issued as a free download.

Track listing
All songs written by Nomeansno.

"Cats, Sex and Nazis" – 8:04 
"I Need You" – 7:31 
"Lost" – 6:16 
"Blinding Light" – 2:53 
"This Wound Will Never Heal" – 6:59 
"John Instrumental" (Demo) – 3:49 
"Victim's Choice" / "Happy Bridge" / "Intro Ghosts" (Demo) – 6:54 
"Now It's Dark" (Demo) – 5:06 
"Cats, Sex and Nazis" (Demo) – 8:32

Personnel
Nomeansno
 Andy Kerr – guitar, bass, vocals
 John Wright (Mr. Right) – vocals, drums, keyboards, percussion, engineering
 Rob Wright (Mr. Wrong) – vocals, bass, guitar

Production and design
 David Bruce – artwork
 Brian (Who) Else – engineering
 Cecil English – producer, engineering

References

External links
0 + 2 = 1  on Discogs.com

2010 compilation albums
Nomeansno albums